Plural Left (IP) was a Spanish electoral coalition in the 2014 European Parliament election made up from both national and regional left-wing parties.

History
Its list obtained 10.03% and 1.575.308 votes, achieving 6 seats distributed as follows:

4 seats to United Left, joined European United Left–Nordic Green Left.
Willy Meyer, resigned as of 25 June 2014
Paloma López Bermejo
Marina Albiol Guzmán
Ángela Rosa Vallina de la Noval
Javier Couso Permuy, takes Meyer's seat.
1 seat to Anova-Nationalist Brotherhood, joined European United Left–Nordic Green Left.
Maria Lidia Senra Rodríguez
1 seat to Initiative for Catalonia Greens, joined The Greens–European Free Alliance
Ernest Urtasun Domenech

Composition

Electoral performance

European Parliament

References

Defunct left-wing political party alliances
Defunct political party alliances in Spain
Socialist parties in Spain
United Left (Spain)